Hangsim is a flight simulator video game that simulates hang gliding or paragliding. It was developed by Quality Simulations and published by Wilco Publishing for Windows in 1999. It was set for release in September 1999, before getting delayed to an eventual release date of November 5, 1999.

Reception

The game received mixed reviews according to the review aggregation website GameRankings.

References

External links
 Press release on Hangsim from Wilco Publishing
 

1999 video games
Flight simulation video games
Hang gliding
Video games developed in Belgium
Windows games
Windows-only games